The top tier of Division 1 was renamed the Algerian Ligue Professionnelle 1 for the start of the 2010–11 season. The following page details the football records and statistics of the Premier League.

League records

Titles
Most titles: 4, ES Sétif
Most consecutive title wins: 2
ES Sétif (2011–2012, 2012–2013)
Biggest title-winning margin: 14 points, 2013–2014; USM Alger (68 points) over JS Kabylie (54 points)
Smallest title-winning margin: 0 points and 13 goal difference – 2011–2012; ES Sétif (+13) over JSM Béjaïa (+14). Both finished on 53 points, but ES Sétif won the title with a superior head to head

Points
Most points in total: 453, USM Alger
 Most points in a season: 68, USM Alger (2013–2014)
Most home points in a season: 43, ASO Chlef (2010–2011)
Most home points in a season: 30, USM Alger (2013–2014)
Most points without winning the league: 57, USM El Harrach (2012–2013)
 Fewest points in a season: 18, MO Béjaïa (2016–2017)
 Fewest home points in a season: 15
WA Tlemcen (2012–2013)
USM Bel Abbès (2012–2013)
CA Bordj Bou Arréridj (2013–2014)
 Fewest away points in a season: 1
USM Annaba (2010–2011)
MC Saida (2011–2012)
ASM Oran (2015–2016)
 Fewest points in a season while winning the league: 48, ES Sétif (2014–2015)
 Most points in a season while being relegated: 38, MC El Eulma (2014–2015)
 Fewest points in a season while surviving relegation: 32, CR Belouizdad (2013–2014)

Wins
Most wins in total: 126, USM Alger
Most wins in a season: 20, USM Alger (2013–2014)
Most home wins in a season: 14
ASO Chlef (2010–2011)
ES Sétif (2012–2013)
Most away wins in a season: 8, USM Alger (2013–2014)
Fewest wins in a season: 3, MO Béjaïa (2016–2017)
Fewest home wins in a season: 3
WA Tlemcen (2012–2013)
CA Bordj Bou Arréridj (2013–2014)
MO Béjaïa (2016–2017)
Fewest away wins in a season: 0
 MC El Eulma (2010–2011)
 USM Annaba (2010–2011)
 AS Khroub (2011–2012)
 NA Hussein Dey (2011–2012)
 MC Saida (2011–2012)
 CRB Aïn Fakroun (2013–2014)
 USM Blida (2015–2016)
 RC Arbaâ (2015–2016)
 ASM Oran (2015–2016)
 JS Saoura (2016–2017)
 CA Batna (2016–2017)
 MO Béjaïa (2016–2017)
 DRB Tadjenanet (2018–2019)
Most consecutive wins: 8, USM Alger (15 February 2014 – 10 May 2014)
Most consecutive wins from the start of a season: 
Most consecutive wins to the end of a season: 
Most consecutive home wins: 16, ES Sétif (5 May 2012 – 21 May 2013)
Most consecutive away wins: 5, USM Alger (29 August 2015 – 24 November 2015)
Most consecutive games without a win: 11, (19 October 2013 – 13 May 2014
Most consecutive games without a win from the start of a season: 
Defeated all league opponents at least once in a season:

Defeats
Fewest losses in a season (30 games): 2, USM Alger (2013–14)
Longest unbeaten run: 22, USM Alger (2013–14)
Most losses in total: 73, MC Oran
Fewest home losses in a season (15 games): :  0, joint record:
 ASO Chlef (2010–11)
 MC Saida (2010–11)
 USM Annaba (2010–11)
 ASO Chlef (2010–11)
 MC Alger (2011–12)
 JS Saoura (2015–16)
 JS Saoura (2016–17)
 ES Sétif (2016–17)
 JS Saoura (2017–18)
 CS Constantine (2017–18)
Most consecutive losses over more than one season (30 games):
Fewest away losses in a season (15 games): 1, USM Alger (2013–14)
Most consecutive home games undefeated: 51, JS Saoura (since 24 January 2015 – in progress 12/05/18)
Most consecutive away games undefeated: 12, joint record: 
 USM Alger (26 October 2013 – 20 September 2014) 
 CS Constantine (19 January 2013 – 9 November 2013)

Draws
Most draws in a season (30 games): :16, NA Hussein Dey (2017–18)
Most home draws in a season: :9, NA Hussein Dey (2017–18)
Most away draws in a season: 9, USM Blida (2015–16)
Fewest draws in a season: 4, joint record:
 ASM Oran (2015–16)
 USM El Harrach (2014–15)
 RC Arbaâ (2014–15)
Fewest home draws in a season: : 0, ES Sétif (2012–13)
Fewest away draws in a season: : 0, WA Tlemcen (2012–13)
Most consecutive draws:
Most draws in total:

Goals
Most goals scored in a season: 89, JE Tizi-Ouzou (1985–86)
Fewest goals scored in a season: 8 – joint record: 
MC Alger (1997–98)
AS Aïn M'lila (1997–98)
Most goals conceded in a season (34 games):
Most goals conceded in a season (30 games): 
Fewest goals conceded in a season: 
Best goal difference in a season: 67, JE Tizi-Ouzou (1985–86)
Most goals scored in a season by a relegated team: 46, WA Mostaganem (1996–97)
Most goals scored at home in a season: 
Fewest goals scored at home in a season:  
Most goals conceded at home in a season (34 games):
Most goals conceded at home in a season (30 games):

Fewest goals conceded at home in a season (34 games or 30 games):
Most goals scored away in a season: 
Fewest goals scored away in a season: 

Most goals conceded away in a season (34 games):
Most goals conceded away in a season (30 games):
Fewest goals conceded away in a season: 
Most clean sheets in a season: 
Fewest failures to score in a match in a season: 
Most goals scored in total:
Most goals conceded in total:
Largest goal deficit overcome to win:  	
	
Largest goal deficit overcome to draw:

Player records

Appearances

Goals

First Algerian Ligue Professionnelle 1 goal: 
Most Algerian Ligue Professionnelle 1 goals: 	
Most Algerian Ligue Professionnelle 1 goals at one club: 
Oldest goalscorer: 
Youngest goalscorer: 
Most consecutive Algerian Ligue Professionnelle 1 matches scored in:   
Most seasons scored in:
Most goals in a season (34 games): 	
 
Most goals in a season (30 games): 

Most Algerian Ligue Professionnelle 1 goals in a calendar year: 
Number of  teams scored against in a season: 
 16-team league:
 
 18-team league:	
 
Most goals in a debut season: 
Most Algerian Ligue Professionnelle 1 hat-tricks in a season:
 
Most Algerian Ligue Professionnelle 1 hat-tricks:	
 
Most goals in a game: 
 

Most goals in one half: 
Fastest goal: 
Most goals scored by a substitute in a game: 
Most consecutive away league matches scored in: 
Most consecutive seasons to score at least 30 Goals: 
Most consecutive seasons to score at least 25 Goals: 
Most consecutive seasons to score at least 20 Goals: 
Most consecutive seasons to score at least 10 Goals: 
Most consecutive seasons to score at least 1 Goal: 
Fastest Algerian Ligue Professionnelle 1 hat-trick: 
Highest number of different clubs to score for: :

Most own goals: 
Most own goals in a season:

Disciplinary
Most red cards: 

Most yellow cards for a player: 
Most yellow cards for a single team in one game: 
Fouling record:

Match records

Scorelines

Biggest home win: 11 goals, joint record:
11–0, USM Alger v. ASM Oran (30 November 1975)
11–0, JE Tizi Ouzou v. JH Djazaïr (1986)
Biggest away win: 0–8, USM Annaba v. CR Belcourt (23 May 1965)	
Highest scoring: 11 goals, joint record:
11–0, USM Alger v. ASM Oran (30 November 1975)
11–0, JE Tizi Ouzou v. JH Djazaïr (1986)
Highest scoring draw: 
Highest scoring in the first half: 

Most frequent scoreline: 
Most individual goal scorers in one game: 

Most individual goal scorers in one game for the same team:

All-time Algerian Ligue Professionnelle 1 table

The all-time Algerian Ligue Professionnelle 1 table is a cumulative record of all match results, points and goals of every team that has played in the Algerian Ligue Professionnelle 1 since its inception in 1964. The table that follows is accurate as of the end of the 2014–15 season. Teams in bold are part of the 2015–16 Algerian Ligue Professionnelle 1. Numbers in bold are the record (highest either positive or negative) numbers in each column.

League or status at 2015–16:

Managers
Most Algerian Ligue Professionnelle 1 winner's medals: 
Most promotions to the Algerian Ligue Professionnelle 1: 
Most relegations from the Algerian Ligue Professionnelle 1: 
Longest-serving manager: 
Shortest-serving manager (excluding caretakers):

Individual records

Players
(at least 5 titles)

References 

 
Algeria